Apostolepis flavotorquata, the Cerrado blackhead or central burrowing snake, is a species of snake in the family Colubridae. It is endemic to Brazil.

References 

flavotorquata
Reptiles described in 1854
Reptiles of Brazil
Taxa named by André Marie Constant Duméril
Category:Taxa named by Gabriel Bibron
Taxa named by Auguste Duméril